The Joe Johnson Memorial Trophy is awarded annually to the most outstanding U Sports men's soccer player. The trophy was donated by the family of the longtime university soccer coach in memory of his contribution to university soccer. The selection is made by a committee composed of members of the U Sports Men’s Soccer Coaches Association and is presented at the U Sports men's soccer championship.

List of past winners

See also
U Sports men's soccer championship MVP

References

External links
 The Joe Johnson Memorial Trophy (Player of the Year)

University and college soccer in Canada